The 2022 Challenger Città di Lugano was a professional tennis tournament played on indoor hard courts. It was the 2nd edition of the tournament which was part of the 2022 ATP Challenger Tour. It took place in Lugano, Switzerland between 28 March and 3 April 2022.

Singles main-draw entrants

Seeds

 1 Rankings are as of 21 March 2022.

Other entrants
The following players received wildcards into the singles main draw:
  Rémy Bertola
  Kilian Feldbausch
  Leandro Riedi

The following players received entry into the singles main draw as alternates:
  Marius Copil
  Luca Nardi

The following players received entry from the qualifying draw:
  Dan Added
  Gijs Brouwer
  Chung Yun-seong
  Jérôme Kym
  Aldin Šetkić
  Otto Virtanen

Champions

Singles

 Luca Nardi def.  Leandro Riedi 4–6, 6–2, 6–3.

Doubles

 Ruben Bemelmans /  Daniel Masur def.  Jérôme Kym /  Leandro Riedi 6–4, 6–7(5–7), [10–7].

References

2022 ATP Challenger Tour
March 2022 sports events in Switzerland
April 2022 sports events in Switzerland
2022 in Swiss sport